Soghad (also Romanized as Şoghād; also known as Şoqād, and Soqad) is a village in Sahrarud Rural District, in the Central District of Fasa County, Fars Province, Iran. At the 2006 census, its population was 93, in 24 families.

References 

Populated places in Fasa County